Playing Place is a village southwest of Truro in Cornwall, England, UK. It is to the east of the A39 road. The name derives from Cornish 'plain an gwarry' (meaning "playing place"), an open-air performance area used historically for entertainment and instruction.

History

The village is located in the parish of Kea, and nearby Old Kea is where St Kea landed in Cornwall on the banks of the River Truro. Plays featuring St Kea were particularly performed here amongst other ordinalia according to a plaque in the village. Bewnans Ke (The Life of Saint Ke) is a Middle Cornish play on the life of the saint, rediscovered in 2000.
In more recent times the play facilities of the villages skatepark has also gained renown. Built in the 1977 it is regarded as one of the few remaining examples of skateparks built at that period. It has bowl with gentle transitions with a tighter speed bowl at one end. In the 1980s a concrete extension was added providing an additional quarter pipe. It has been saved from destruction owing to the roots of some nearby protected trees which have spread underneath it. However it is not always kept clean.

References

Villages in Cornwall